Catlett Historic District is a national historic district located at Catlett, Fauquier County, Virginia.  It encompasses 119 contributing buildings, 2 contributing sites, and 11 contributing structures in the rural village of Catlett.  It contains a collection of buildings that represent the town during the late 19th and early-to-mid 20th centuries.  Notable buildings include Prospect Acres (c. 1855), Edmonds Place (c. 1870), Trenis House, the Gothic Revival style Trinity Church (1872), the former Ensor's Store, Leidy Wilson's Store, and the Wilson Farms Meat Company.

It was listed on the National Register of Historic Places in 2008.

Gallery

References

Historic districts in Fauquier County, Virginia
National Register of Historic Places in Fauquier County, Virginia
Historic districts on the National Register of Historic Places in Virginia